The Saunders Roe A.37 Shrimp was a 1930s British two-seat four-engined experimental flying boat built by Saunders-Roe Limited ("Saro") at Cowes.

Development
The Shrimp was designed by H Knowler in 1939 as a half-size research aircraft as part of a development programme for the Saunders-Roe S.38 a four-engined patrol flying-boat to Specification R.5/39 – a replacement for the Short Sunderland. The R.5/39 project was cancelled but the Shrimp was completed as a private venture. Registered as G-AFZS, it was first flown at Cowes in October 1939. It was based at Beaumaris, Anglesey where a slipway was built for it. The Ministry of Aircraft Production acquired it in 1944 with the serial TK580 for tests to help the design of the Short Shetland a successor to the R.5/39 project being developed jointly by Saro and Short Brothers. For this its twin rudder tail was swapped for a single fin and the hull was modified to represent that of the Shetland.

The Shrimp was scrapped at Felixstowe in 1949.

Operators

Air Ministry
Saunders Roe

Specifications

See also

References
Notes

Bibliography

 Green, William. Warplanes of the Second World War, Volume 5: Flying Boats. London: Macdonald & Company (Publishers) Ltd., 1962 (5th Impression 1972). .
 Jackson, A.J. British Civil Aircraft since 1919. London: Putnam & Company, 1974. .
 Jarrett, Philip. "Nothing Ventured...No 12". Aeroplane Monthly, March 1991, Vol 19 No, 3 Issue 215. ISSN  0143-7240. pp. 146–150.
 London, Peter. Saunders and Saro Aircraft Since 1917. London: Putnam (Conway Maritime Press), London, 1988. .

External links

 Saro A.37 – British Aircraft Directory
 Saro A.37 – British aircraft of World War II
 "Dynamic Similarity" a 1940 Flight article

1930s British experimental aircraft
Flying boats
Shrimp
Four-engined tractor aircraft
High-wing aircraft
Aircraft first flown in 1939
Four-engined piston aircraft